Peter van Velzen (born 11 October 1958 in Pijnacker, South Holland) is a retired football player who played as a forward.

After ending his professional football career, he became a football manager, guiding FC Dordrecht in the 1991 season. Van Velzen is a three-time topscorer of the Dutch Eerste Divisie.

References
 VI Profile

1958 births
Living people
People from Pijnacker-Nootdorp
Dutch footballers
Dutch expatriate footballers
Dutch football managers
Association football forwards
Eredivisie players
Eerste Divisie players
Belgian Pro League players
K.S.K. Beveren players
RKC Waalwijk players
HFC Haarlem players
Expatriate footballers in Belgium
Dutch expatriate sportspeople in Belgium
SV SVV players
Footballers from South Holland